Jani Papadhopulli (1874 - 1939), also known as Jan Papadopulli, was one of the delegates of the Albanian Declaration of Independence, who was later elected as deputy of the Albanian parliament in 1923-1924, representing Gjirokastër District.
A merchant by profession, Papadhopuli was a delegate of Gjirokaster in the Albanian Orthodox Congress of 1922, where the autocephaly of the Albanian church was declared.

References

Sources 
 "History of Albanian People" Albanian Academy of Science.

19th-century Albanian politicians
20th-century Albanian politicians
People from Dropull
People from Janina vilayet
All-Albanian Congress delegates
Members of the Albanian Orthodox Church
1874 births
1939 deaths